Bandit Queen were a three-piece indie rock band from Manchester, England, formed in 1992. They disbanded in 1998 after releasing one album.

History
The band was formed by former music journalist and member of Swirl, Tracy Godding (vocals, guitar), along with fellow former Swirl members Janet Wolstenholme (bass guitar) and David Galley (drums), with the band name inspired by Phoolan Devi. Godding explained "I was just inspired by her endurance".

The band were signed by Playtime Records, who issued all of their releases, with their second EP and debut album also issued in the US by Mammoth Records, although the latter had one track removed for the US release, the band speculating that this may have been due to it "having the word 'cunt' in it 32 times".

Debut album Hormone Hotel was produced by Pat Collier and John Robb, and featured a picture of one of the band's key influences on its cover, Frida Kahlo. The band recorded a second album in 1997, co -produced by the band and Mark Freegard, but it wasn't released and the band split and went their own ways in 1998.

Musical style
Colin Larkin described the band's sound as blending "the pop sensibilities of early Blondie with the modern feminist swagger of The Breeders". Douglas Wolk described them as "a streamlined rock trio, with a dry, explosive sound that recalls In Utero or the first couple of PJ Harvey albums".

Discography

Singles, EPs
Dirt + Soul EP (1993), Playtime
"Scorch" (1994), Playtime
"Queen Bee" (1994), Playtime
"Miss Dandy's" (1994), Playtime
"Give it to the Dog" (1995), Playtime

Albums
Hormone Hotel (1994), Playtime
PET (2010)

References

Musical groups from Manchester
English indie rock groups
Musical groups established in 1992
Musical groups disestablished in 1995
Mammoth Records artists